M. F. Enterprises was a 1966–67 comic book publisher owned by artist and 1970s pulp-magazine entrepreneur Myron Fass, whose holdings also included the black-and-white horror comics magazine imprint Eerie Publications.

M.F.'s best-known character was Captain Marvel (no relation to the Fawcett Comics, DC Comics or Marvel Comics superheroes of that name), a crimefighting alien android who could detach his head, limbs and hands and send them flying off in all directions whenever he shouted "Split!" and reattach them when he shouted "Xam!".

M. F. Enterprises also published Henry Brewster from February 1966 to September 1967, a teen-humor comic created by artist Bob Powell, which lasted seven issues and followed the adventures and misadventures of the red-headed All-American teenager and his friends: the big, squeaky-voiced jock Animal; brainy, bespectacled Weenie; and the beautiful Debbie and Melody. Their teacher was a former secret agent named Mr. Secrett, who was always happy to lend a handy gadget when needed.

Although the M. F. Enterprises brand stopped publishing comics in 1967, publisher Myron Fass continued with his Eerie Publications line of black-and-white mostly horror comic magazines until 1981.

Titles published 
 Captain Marvel (4 issues, Apr. – Nov. 1966)
 Captain Marvel Presents The Terrible Five (1 issue, Sept. 1967)—continues the numbering of Captain Marvel
 Great West (1969)
 Henry Brewster (7 issues, Feb. 1966 – Sept. 1967)

References

External links
 
 
 Myron Fass enterprises entry, Who's Who of American Comic Books, 1928–1999
 Bad Mags entry on Myron Fass

Comic book publishing companies of the United States
Defunct comics and manga publishing companies
1966 establishments in New York City